Raphaël Nadé (born 18 October 1980) is a French-Ivorian professional footballer. He is currently without a club, after leaving English side Ebbsfleet United.

Nadé started his career at French outfit Le Havre before joining Troyes. He then joined non-league English sides Hampton & Richmond Borough and Welling United, before joining Woking in 2002.

Before the 2005–06 season he signed for Carlisle United for an undisclosed fee, as they club embarked on their first season back in the Football League. When Michael Bridges joined Carlisle, Nadé lost his place in the team and so went on loan to Weymouth, scoring 13 goals as Weymouth secured promotion to the Conference National. On 31 July 2006 Nadé rejoined Weymouth on a season long loan. On 18 May 2007, Nadé terminated his contract with Carlisle.

On 4 July 2007 he joined Ebbsfleet United. He was released at the end of the 2007–08 season.

References

External links

Official Ebbsfleet United profile via archive.org

1980 births
Living people
Footballers from Abidjan
Ivorian footballers
French footballers
French sportspeople of Ivorian descent
Association football wingers
Association football forwards
Le Havre AC players
ES Troyes AC players
Hampton & Richmond Borough F.C. players
Welling United F.C. players
Woking F.C. players
Carlisle United F.C. players
Weymouth F.C. players
Ebbsfleet United F.C. players
English Football League players